Anacleto Jiménez Pastor  (born 24 February 1967 in Logroño, La Rioja) is a retired Spanish long-distance runner.

Achievements

Personal bests
1500 metres - 3:34.47 min (1996)
3000 metres - 7:35.83 min (1998)
5000 metres - 13:08.30 min (1997)
10,000 metres - 28:27.98 min (1999)

References

1967 births
Living people
Spanish male long-distance runners
Spanish male middle-distance runners
Olympic athletes of Spain
Athletes (track and field) at the 1996 Summer Olympics
Universiade medalists in athletics (track and field)
Universiade gold medalists for Spain
Medalists at the 1987 Summer Universiade